Ladrawan is a census village in Jhajjar district in the Indian state of Haryana.It is much developed than its neighbouring villages.

Demographics
 India census, Ladrawan had a population of 8007. Males constitute 55% of the population and females 45%. Ladrawan has an average literacy rate of 49%, lower than the national average of 59.5%: male literacy is 57%, and female literacy is 39%. In Ladrawan, 17% of the population is under 6 years of age. The main gotra in the village are chhikara,Vats,Hooda(yogi),jangra

References

HR

Cities and towns in Jhajjar district